Parit Sakai is a small village in Muar District, Johor, Malaysia. This village is located about 5 km from Muar town. The famous Makam Panglima Lidah Hitam, a legendary silat master is located here.

Muar District
Towns, suburbs and villages in Muar